Up Close is the second studio album by Australian country singer Gina Jeffreys. It was released in July 1996 and became Jeffreys’ first top ten album after it debuted at No.9. It was certified Gold in Australia.

The album contained the song "Didn’t We Shine" which won Jeffreys her third consecutive 'Female Vocalist of the Year' award at the 1996 Tamworth Country Music Awards of Australia.

It also included the song "I Haven’t Got a Heart" which won Jeffreys her first APRA Award in 1998 for ‘Most Performed Country Work’.

Promotion and tour
Jeffrey's promoted the album with performances on 'Today Today', 'Midday', 'Hey Hey It's Saturday' and 'A Current Affair', as well as on national ‘Carols by Candlelight' and 'Carols in the Domain’ 

Throughout 1996/97, Jeffreys toured Australia.

Track listing
 Standard Edition 
 "Girl Talk" (Gina Jeffreys, Garth Porter, Rod McCormack, Beccy Cole) (3:06) 
 "Under The Influence of Love"  (Buck Owens, Harlan Howard) (3:21) 
 "The Bridge" (Tom Kimmel, Jack Pittmann) (3:41) 
 "Josephine" (Gina Jeffreys, Garth Porter, David Bates, Rod McCormack) (3:52) 
 "I Don’t Do Lonely" (K Williams, D Malloy, T Johnson) (3:12) 
 "Up Close Personal Attention" (L Raintree, J Raymond, J Stewart) (3:23) 
 "I Haven’t Got a Heart" (Gina Jeffreys, Garth Porter, David Bates, Rod McCormack) (4:29) 
 "The Weatherman" (Gina Jeffreys, Garth Porter, David Bates) (5:11) 
 "Hard Working Man" (Gina Jeffreys, Garth Porter, Rod McCormack) (3:22) 
 "Don’t" (Gina Jeffreys, Garth Porter, Rod McCormack) (3:34)
 "Coming Back" (Gina Jeffreys, Garth Porter, Rod McCormack) (2:59)
 "Since You Went Away" (Gina Jeffreys, David Bates, Rod McCormack, Fiona Kernaghan) (3:48)  
 "I Believe" Gina Jeffreys, Garth Porter) (2:50) 
 "Didn’t We Shine" (Jesse Winchester, Don Schlitz) (3:54)  Bonus Track

Charts

Weekly charts

Year-end charts

Accredications

Personnel
Adapted from album liner.

 Produced by Garth Porter
 Engineered by Ted Howard
 Additional Engineering by Jeff McCormack & David Hemming
 Mixed by Ted Howard, Garth Porter & Rod McCormack
 Recorded at Studios 301, Sydney
 Mastered by Steve Smart
 Assisted by Scott Rashleigh
 Photography by Jon Waddy
 John Watson – Drums
 Jeff McCormack – Bass
 Rod McCormack – Electric, Baritone & Acoustic Guitar, Lap Steel
 Mark Punch – Electric Guitar
 Rex Goh – Electric Guitar
 Larry Muhoberac – Piano, Keyboards, Organ
 Mick Albeck – Fiddle
 Garth Porter – Tambourine, B3 Hammond Organ, Percussion
 Steve Fearnley – Percussion
 Michel Rose – Pedal Steel
 Lawrie Minson – Harmonica
 Kym Warner - Mandolin
 Phillip Hartyl, Rebecca Daniel, Anne-Louise Comerford & Antony Morgan (aka String Quartet) - Strings
 James Gillard, Mark Punch, Rod McCormack, Gina Jeffreys, Chrissy Moy, Beccy Cole, Sandy Chic, Erana Clark – Backing Vocals

References

1996 albums
Gina Jeffreys albums